"Bottled Up" is the debut solo single by American singer Dinah Jane,  featuring fellow American singers Ty Dolla Sign and Marc E. Bassy. It was written by A.CHAL, Ty Dolla Sign, Bassy, and Jane. It was released on September 21, 2018. The song was noted for having a similar sound to Jane’s former group’s, Fifth Harmony, music. It is an R&B song with tropical and hip hop influences, while lyrically, it is about someone who bottles up their feelings and uses alcohol and drugs to hide them.

Background and release
"Bottled Up" was written by A.CHAL, Tyrone William Griffin Jr, Marc Griffin and Dinah Jane with the production done by James Hau, David Park, William Mosgrove, Nick Balding. It is Jane's official debut single but won't be in her upcoming debut album; instead, it serves as a transition from her former music with the group until she "finds her sound".

Jane had a choice to add another artist to the song, and she chose Ty Dolla Sign and Marc E. Bassy; she had previously worked with the former as a part of Fifth Harmony in the top-ten single, "Work from Home", and she's been wanting to work with the latter since her time in the group. She references three of the group's most famous singles: "Work from Home", "Worth It" and "Down". Jane performed the track at the New York Fashion Week during one of Teen Vogue’s performances.

She made her solo TV debut on The Tonight Show Starring Jimmy Fallon on Monday, October 8, performing the song alongside Marc E. Bassy and Ty Dolla $ign. In an interview with Music Choice she explained the song's similar sound to Fifth Harmony's music saying, "I remember being in the studio with Marc, and he was just like, ‘So what’s your vibe? Where do you wanna go with this? You wanna just make hits or do you wanna go global?’ I was like, ‘I wanna go global. I want a global record' […] I love this record a lot […] It’s been a year or two... and I feel like because it’s such a bop to me, it can be a bop to other people, as well.”

Jane released Spanish and Portuguese versions of the song on November 8, which kept Ty Dolla Sign's verse and removed Bassy's vocals.

Composition and lyrics
"Bottled Up" is a midtempo, R&B song that draws influences of tropical, reggae and hip hop music. It contains a "light tropical-tinged backbeat with a simple urban bassline." It runs for a total of three minutes and twenty seconds. Lyrically, the song is about "drinking your feelings away". In an interview with Z100, Jane said, "It’s about someone who has a hard time sharing their emotions, so they bottle up their feelings and they turn to smoking and drinking because that’s the way they’re getting it out." The song is in 97 beats per minute.

Music video
The song's music video, directed by Hannah Lux Davis, was released on November 7, 2018.

Critical reception
"Bottled Up" received both positive and negative feedback; the latter was mostly because of the song's sound, which was very similar to that of Fifth Harmony's.  Thomas Bleech said that the "chorus was way too simple" and that "not even a guest rap verse from Ty Dolla $ign could save this song and make it somewhat likeable or commercially ready." Mike Neid from Idolator said that "Jane gets a little flirty" and "she and Marc E. Bassy need a little coaxing to open up about their feelings." Matt Gehring from MTV said that they "loved the 'Work from Home and 'Worth It' references" and that they're "ready for a hit maker". HotNewHipHop called the song "upbeat and high energy" and that it tackles "the subject of bottling up emotions in romantic relationships."

Track listing

Credits and personnel
Credits adapted from Tidal.

Dinah Jane – songwriting, vocals
Ty Dolla Sign – songwriting, vocals
Marc E. Bassy – songwriting, vocals
Alejandro Chal – songwriting
James Hau – producer
David Park – producer
William Mosgrove – producer
Nick Balding – producer

Charts

References

2018 songs
2018 debut singles
Dinah Jane songs
Vocal collaborations
Contemporary R&B ballads
Songs written by Ty Dolla Sign
Ty Dolla Sign songs
Songs written by A.Chal
Music videos directed by Hannah Lux Davis